NGC 149 is a lenticular galaxy in the Andromeda constellation. It was discovered by Édouard Stephan on October 4, 1883.

References

External links 
 
 SEDS

Andromeda (constellation)
Astronomical objects discovered in 1883
+05-02-024
002028
00332
0149
Lenticular galaxies